Falconara Marittima is a seaside resort on the Adriatic coast, in Italy, located  north of Ancona, in the Marche region, province of Ancona.

History
Falconara developed around a castle. In the second half of the 16th century it was bought by the noble family of Bourbon del Monte. In the 19th century they were still present as owners. The Castle of Falconara, together with those of Rocca Priora and of Castelferretti, represented a defence system around Ancona, which controlled the territory and demanded bridge toll for crossing over the river Esino and had many other functions.

Demographics
, 90.94% of the population was Italian. The largest immigrant group came from Albania and Romania 4.75%, followed by North Africa 1.17%.

Sights
Falconara Marittima's main attraction is a long sandy beach where during the summer people practice sports such as beach volleyball, beach tennis and beach soccer.

Falconara has a  zoo.

Every year on 15 August, the Ferragosto holiday a fireworks display takes place.

The Frecce Tricolori show took place in the sky of Falconara Marittima in the summer of 2007 and 2009

The Cormorano park on the north side of town has hosted numerous cultural events, including concerts of Francesco De Gregori, Goran Bregovic and Piero Pelù.

Among its religious sites is the church of Santa Maria della Misericordia with 15th-century frescoes.

Climate
Winters can be quite cold due to the bora, an icy wind that blows along the coast, however snow is rare. The last recorded heavy snowfall occurred in February 2012, then again in February 2018 

From April to June the climate is warm and pleasant, with moderate humidity. July and August can be very hot, with high temperatures usually above .

In 2003 Falconara experienced twin tornados along the coast.

Transportation
Ancona Airport is located in Falconara Marittima. The Falconara-Orte main line is one of the few transversal lines on the Italian Railway Network; the Adriatic line also passes through Falconara railway station.
Falconara Airport was used by the United States Army Air Forces  between 1 April and 1 September 1945 as a military airfield.

Sport
The local volleyball team Pallavolo Falconara won the CEV Cup in 1986 and reached play-off semifinal of Italian Volleyball League two times in the eighties.
Notable former volleyball players of the club include Ferdinando De Giorgi, Daniel Castellani, Tom Sorensen, Raimonds Vilde, Jan Kvalheim, Andrea Anastasi, Leondino Giombini, Pasquale Gravina, Valerio Vermiglio and Samuele Papi.

References

Seaside resorts in Italy